Hallelujah New World is a song written by Daniel Bellqvist, Frederik Zäll and Robert Birming, and recorded performed by Eskobar at Melodifestivalen 2008, participating in the third semifinal inside the Cloetta Center in Linköping on 23 February 2008, where the song ended up eight, and didn't made it further.

Escobar also released as a single in 2008, and it also appeared on their 2008 album Death in Athens. The single peaked at 55th position at the Swedish singles chart.

Charts

References

2008 singles
English-language Swedish songs
2008 songs
Eskobar songs